Meister Hartmann was a German sculptor active from c. 1417 to 1428, and the earliest exponent of the Ulm school.

Further reading 
 Barbara Maier-Lörcher: Meisterwerke Ulmer Kunst. p. 17. Ostfildern 2004, 
 Claudia Lichte. "Hartmann, Meister." In Grove Art Online. Oxford Art Online, (accessed January 1, 2012). 
 Reinhard Wortmann: "Ulm als Kunstmetropole Schwabens. Ulmer Kunst - Kunst in Ulm". Meisterwerke massenhaft. Die Bildhauerwerkstatt des Niklaus Weckmann und die Malerei in Ulm um 1500. pp. 29–46. Württembergischen Landesmuseum Stuttgart, 1993,

External links 
 

15th-century German sculptors
German male sculptors